Same-sex marriage has been legal in Veracruz since 13 June 2022. On 30 May 2022, the Mexican Supreme Court ruled that the state's same-sex marriage ban violated Articles 1 and 4 of the Constitution of Mexico. The Congress of Veracruz passed a bill to legalize same-sex marriage three days later on 2 June 2022. It was published in the official state journal on 13 June and went into effect the same day.

Veracruz has also recognised gender-neutral concubinage, granting same-sex cohabitating couples all of the rights and obligations of marriage, including adoption, since 11 June 2020.

Legal history

Background

The Mexican Supreme Court ruled on 12 June 2015 that state bans on same-sex marriage are unconstitutional nationwide. The court's ruling is considered a "jurisprudential thesis" and did not invalidate state laws, meaning that same-sex couples denied the right to marry would still have to seek amparos in court. The ruling standardized the procedures for judges and courts throughout Mexico to approve all applications for same-sex marriages and made the approval mandatory. Specifically, the court ruled that bans on same-sex marriage violate Articles 1 and 4 of the Constitution of Mexico. Article 1 of the Constitution states that "any form of discrimination, based on ethnic or national origin, gender, age, disabilities, social status, medical conditions, religion, opinions, sexual orientation, marital status, or any other form, which violates the human dignity or seeks to annul or diminish the rights and freedoms of the people, is prohibited.", and Article 4 relates to matrimonial equality, stating that "man and woman are equal under the law. The law shall protect the organization and development of the family." The Constitution of Veracruz does not expressly prohibit same-sex marriages. Article 6 of the Constitution states that "the State will promote the necessary conditions for the full enjoyment of liberty, equality, security and non-discrimination of the people".

In February 2014, couple Javier Darío Olivares García and Víctor Manuel Durán Sáenz applied for a marriage license at the civil registry office in Heroica Veracruz. The couple were turned down, and subsequently filed an amparo in court, which was granted by a federal judge on 22 July 2014. Despite the approval, the registrar refused to schedule a ceremony for the couple. After presenting their amparo to the registrar in Boca del Río, the marriage was scheduled for 6 December 2014. Their wedding was the first same-sex marriage in the state of Veracruz. On 29 January 2015, a local LGBT group, Comunidad Jarochos, announced that a lesbian couple had won an amparo and would marry on 4 April 2015. The group also announced that there were 8 pending amparos in the state. Four additional couples filed amparos in court on 16 May 2016. On 26 May 2016, three couples (two lesbian couples and one male couple) were granted the right to marry.

A lawsuit challenging article 75 of the Civil Code, which defined marriage as the "union of a man and a woman", was filed on 20 July 2017 with the Fourth District Court. On 7 November 2017, Judge José Arquímedes Gregorio Loranca Luna declared the state's same-sex marriage ban unconstitutional. Guillermo Izacur Maldonado, president of Comunidad Jarochos, argued that the ruling was a "general injunction" that covers every same-sex couple in the state and that same-sex marriage should thus effectively be legal in the state as a result of this court decision. However, state officials announced they would continue to enforce the state's same-sex marriage ban despite the court ruling.

18 same-sex marriages had been performed in Veracruz by August 2017. By early 2019, this had increased to 69 marriages, and to 150 marriages by July 2020. All these couples married using the recurso de amparo remedy.

Legislative action
Civil union legislation was first proposed in Veracruz in 2014. In March 2014, Deputy Cuauhtémoc Pola Estrada from the Citizens' Movement party introduced a partnership bill to the Congress of Veracruz. The bill was opposed by the governing parties and saw little legislation action. In July 2014, Pola Estrada introduced a proposal to amend article 75 of the Civil Code to legalize same-sex marriage. In September 2014, he confirmed that the bill was still awaiting reviews by legislative committees. In April 2015, citing disappointment with the bills being stalled, the president of the State Human Rights Commission announced his intention to propose a new same-sex marriage bill. In July 2016, Deputy Mónica Robles Barajas from the Ecologist Green Party submitted another measure to legalize same-sex marriage. These bills saw very little legislative progress due to opposition from the governing National Action Party (PAN).

In July 2018, as one of its last actions before leaving office, PAN submitted a proposal to Congress to explicitly ban same-sex marriage in the State Constitution. It failed to pass, with 32 deputies in favor, 10 against and 2 absentions. As 33 votes were needed to amend the Constitution, the measure failed by one vote. The July 2018 elections resulted in the National Regeneration Movement (MORENA) winning the majority of legislative seats in Congress and the governorship. MORENA's party platform includes support for LGBT rights and same-sex marriage.

Cohabitation law (2020)
On 28 May 2020, the Congress of Veracruz passed a cohabitation bill by a vote of 35–12. The law grants cohabitating couples, different-sex or same-sex, the same rights, benefits and obligations as married couples. The law was published in the official state journal on 10 June, following the signature of Governor Cuitláhuac García Jiménez, and went into effect the following day. The legislation defines cohabitation as follows:
 in Spanish: El concubinato es la unión de hecho entre dos personas, sin que exista un contrato entre ellos, ambos se encuentren libres de matrimonio y que deciden compartir la vida para apoyarse mutuamente.
 (Concubinage is the facto union between two people, without there being a contract between them, both being free from marriage and deciding to share their lives together in order to support each other.)

Same-sex marriage law (2022)
Three days after the Mexican Supreme Court struck down the state's same-sex marriage ban in an action of unconstitutionality on 30 May 2022, the Congress of Veracruz passed legislation amending state law to define marriage as the union of "two people". The bill had been introduced two months prior on 5 April by deputies Gonzalo Durán Chincoya and Ramón Diaz Ávila. The law was passed by 36 votes to 4. It was published in the official state journal on 13 June, following Governor Cuitláhuac García Jiménez's signature, and took effect that same day. The first same-sex couple to marry in Veracruz under the new law were Wendy Arlette Segovia Aguilar and Lucía Marisol González Cruz in San Andrés Tuxtla on 15 June 2022.

Article 75 of the Civil Code of Veracruz was amended to read:
 in Spanish: 
 (Marriage is the union of two people who, through a civil contract, freely decide to share a community of life based on an affective relationship in a spirit of permanence, cooperation and mutual support and without any legal impediment.)

Action of unconstitutionality (2020–2022)
On 28 May 2020, the Congress of Veracruz amended state family law to recognize same-sex cohabitation but at the same time it did not repeal the state's same-sex marriage ban. Shortly following the law's publication in the official state journal on 10 June, the National Human Rights Commission filed an action of unconstitutionality (acción de inconstitucionalidad; docketed 144/2020) against the state of Veracruz, contesting the constitutionality of the new cohabitation law and various articles of the Civil Code that banned same-sex marriage. This lawsuit sought to fully legalize same-sex marriage in the state, similarly to what happened in numerous other states, including Jalisco (2016), Chiapas (2017), Puebla (2017), Aguascalientes (2019), and Nuevo León (2019).

On 30 May 2022, the Supreme Court ruled 10–0 that article 75 of the Civil Code, which banned same-sex marriage, was void and unconstitutional. The decision would officially take effect upon publication in the Official Journal of the Federation (Diario Oficial de la Federación), but state civil registry officials had the possibility to implement the decision immediately. Congress passed a same-sex marriage bill just three days later, legalizing same-sex marriage in Veracruz. The court ruling was published in the Official Journal on 20 October 2022.

Public opinion
According to a 2018 survey by the National Institute of Statistics and Geography, 54% of the Veracruz public opposed same-sex marriage, the fourth highest in Mexico.

See also

 Same-sex marriage in Mexico
 LGBT rights in Mexico

Notes

References

External links
Text of Veracruz's same-sex marriage law (in Spanish)

Veracruz
Veracruz
2022 in LGBT history